This is a list of the most notable films produced in Germany of the  Weimar Republic era from 1919 until 1932, in year order. This period, between the end of World War I and the advent of the Nazi regime, is considered an early renaissance in world cinema, with many influential and important films being made. The style of many of these films is called German Expressionism.

For an alphabetical list of articles on Weimar German films see :Category:Films of the Weimar Republic.

1919 

See List of German films of 1919

1920 

See List of German films of 1920

1921 

See List of German films of 1921

1922 

See List of German films of 1922

1923 

See List of German films of 1923

1924 

See List of German films of 1924

1925 

See List of German films of 1925

1926 

See List of German films of 1926

1927 

See List of German films of 1927

1928 

See List of German films of 1928

1929 

See List of German films of 1929

1930 

See List of German films of 1930

1931 

See List of German films of 1931

1932 
See List of German films of 1932

See also 
 Universum Film AG
 Cinema of Germany
 German Expressionism
 List of films set in Berlin
 List of films made in France 1919-1940
 List of films made in Poland in the Interwar Period
 List of films made in First Republic of Czechoslovakia
 List of Dutch Films made in the Interwar period (1919-1940)

References 

1919
 
Films
Germany
Films
Germany
Films
Germany
Films